Upper Burringbar is a town located in north-eastern New South Wales, Australia, in the Tweed Shire.

Demographics

The median age of the Upper Burringbar population was 43 years, 6 years above the national median of 37.

77.3% of people living in Upper Burringbar were born in Australia. The other top responses for country of birth were England 5%, Japan 2.1%, Italy 1.4%, New Zealand 1.4%, Switzerland 1.1%, 11.9% other countries.

85.5% of people spoke only English at home; the next most common languages were 2.1% Japanese, 1.1% Welsh, 1.1% Thai, 4.3% other languages.

References 

Suburbs of Tweed Heads, New South Wales